The Rapid City Flying Aces were a professional indoor American football team in Rapid City, South Dakota.  Like their predecessors, the Black Hills Red Dogs, they played their home games at the Don Barnett Arena in Rapid City. As of April 2007, the Flying Aces did not belong to any football league. The team was affiliated with the original Indoor Football League in 2000; with the National Indoor Football League from 2001 to 2004 and in 2006; and with United Indoor Football in 2005.  The team considered rejoining United Indoor Football in 2008.

The Flying Aces won at least 10 out of 14 games three times in their seven seasons; however, organizational turmoil threatened the existence of the franchise.

History

2000–2005
The team began play as the Black Hills Machine of the Indoor Football League in 2000.  They lost in the first round of the playoffs to the Topeka Kings.  When the IFL folded, the franchise moved to the newly formed National Indoor Football League as a charter member and became the Rapid City Red Dogs.  The team played in the NIFL from 2001 to 2003. In 2004, the franchise renamed itself the Black Hills Red Dogs. In 2005, the Red Dogs joined the United Indoor Football as a charter member and won a single game during their inaugural season in the UIF. Also in 2005, the team signed quarterback Chris Dixon. Dixon would later become the first indoor football player to throw for 500 touchdowns in his career.

2006 season
In 2006, the franchise moved back to the NIFL and became the Rapid City Flying Aces. During the 2006 season, they began the season 8–0. It appeared the team was going to fold when owner Howard Neal left the franchise in a financial mess; However, several local investors helped pay the bills and save the team. The team went on to the Pacific Conference title game, where they lost to the Billings Outlaws.

Unfortunately, there was not enough time to save the team and the franchise would fold in December 2006. Former owner Howard Weiner, who went by the alias "Howard Neal", was sentenced to four months in prison after admitting to committing bank fraud and was also sentenced to five years of probation and ordered to pay $116,000 in restitution. He had until July 18, 2011, to turn himself in at the Coleman Federal Correctional Complex in Coleman, Florida.

Season-by-season 

|-
| colspan="6" align="center" | Black Hills Machine (IFL)
|-
|2000 || 10 || 4 || 0 || 2nd WC Northern || Lost Round 1 (Topeka)
|-
| colspan="6" align="center" | Rapid City Red Dogs (NIFL)
|-
|2001 || 13 || 1 || 0 || 1st PC Central || Lost Round 1 (Sioux Falls)
|-
|2002 || 6 || 8 || 0 || 4th PC Western || —
|-
|2003 || 7 || 7 || 0 || 3rd PC Western || —
|-
| colspan="6" align="center" | Black Hills Red Dogs (NIFL)
|-
|2004 || 3 || 11 || 0 || 4th PC Western || —
|-
| colspan="6" align="center" | Black Hills Red Dogs (UIF)
|-
|2005 || 1 || 14 || 0 || 4th North || —
|-
| colspan="6" align="center" | Rapid City Flying Aces (NIFL)
|-
|2006 || 11 || 3 || 0 || 1st Pacific West || Won Pacific Semi-Final (Katy)Lost Pacific Championship (Billings)
|-
!Totals || 52 || 51 || 0
|colspan="2"| (including playoffs)

Notable players
Chris Dixon
Renz Julian – American rapper
Scott Pingel

References

External links
Source for Flying Aces news and information
National Indoor Football League website
United Indoor Football website

Indoor Football League (1999–2000) teams
American football teams in South Dakota
American football teams established in 2000
American football teams disestablished in 2006
Sports in Rapid City, South Dakota
2000 establishments in South Dakota
2006 disestablishments in South Dakota